The National Infrastructure Development Company Limited (NIDCO), is a state owned company of Trinidad and Tobago. It was founded on January 11, 2005, but the inaugural Board was appointed on 22 March 2005. It is carrying out infrastructure projects that form Vision 2020, which is a plan created by the government, to achieve first world status, by the year 2020. NIDCO Major infrastructure projects missions are drainage and flood control, reclamation, highway and transportation sectors and also NIDCO is responsible for the provision of project management services, procurement of consultants and contractors, and oversight of project execution within agreed time, costs and quality parameters.

NIDCO Projects
 Water Taxis Service-Its owned by NIDCO
 San Fernando to Point Fortin Highway-Proposed Highway
 Trinidad Rapid Railway-In September 2010, the project was scrapped by the People's Partnership Government
 Aranguez Flyover

References

External links
 Official website

Government-owned companies of Trinidad and Tobago
Companies established in 2005
2005 establishments in Trinidad and Tobago
Construction and civil engineering companies established in 2005